Oligophyton is a genus of flowering plants from the orchid family, Orchidaceae. It contains only one known species, Oligophyton drummondii, endemic to the Chimanimani Mountains of Zimbabwe.

See also 
 List of Orchidaceae genera

References 

Berg Pana, H. 2005. Handbuch der Orchideen-Namen. Dictionary of Orchid Names. Dizionario dei nomi delle orchidee. Ulmer, Stuttgart

External links 

Orchideae genera
Orchids of Africa
Flora of Zimbabwe
Monotypic Orchidoideae genera